Riverwalk is a Metromover station in Downtown, Miami, Florida near the northern banks of the Miami River and adjacent to the Miami Riverwalk.

This station is located on Southeast Fourth Street just east of First Avenue. It opened to service May 26, 1994. The red "M" placed as an entranceway to the station was designed by Roberto Behar and Rosario Marquardt.

Station layout

External links
 
 MDT – Metromover Stations
4th Street entrance from Google Maps Street View

References 

Brickell Loop
Metromover stations
Railway stations in the United States opened in 1994
1994 establishments in Florida